Statistics of Belgian First Division in the 1933–34 season.

Overview

It was contested by 14 teams, and Royale Union Saint-Gilloise won the championship.

League standings

Results

References

Belgian Pro League seasons
Belgian First Division, 1933-34
1933–34 in Belgian football